Abrit (historical name: Aptaat) is a village in Krushari Municipality, Dobrich Province, northeastern Bulgaria.

Abrit Nunatak on Trinity Peninsula in Antarctica is named after the village.

The village has a population of 205 inhabitants, out of which 144 (70.2%) are Bulgarian Turks, 35 (17.1%) Roma and 26 (12.7%) Bulgarians, according to the 2011 census.

Near Abrit is located the medieval fortress Zaldapa, which lies next to the lake Zaldapa.

References

Villages in Dobrich Province